Rain on the Window is an album by English saxophonist John Surman with organist Howard Moody recorded in 2006 and released on the ECM label.

Reception
The Allmusic review by Michael G. Nastos awarded the album 3½ stars, stating, "If the listener enjoys a variety of folk forms turned into modern music, Rain on the Window may be appropriate, used here and there for any precipitous, or sunny day".

Track listing
All compositions by John Surman except as indicated
 "Circum I" - 3:58 
 "Stained Glass" - 3:49 
 "The Old Dutch" - 3:30 
 "Dancing in the Loft" (Howard Moody, John Surman) - 1:53 
 "Step Lively!" (Moody, Surman) - 3:06 
 "Stone Ground" - 4:19 
 "Tierce" (Moody) - 2:59 
 "Circum II" - 2:03 
 "Rain on the Window" - 4:06 
 "Dark Reeds" (Moody, Surman) - 2:50 
 "O Waly Waly" (Traditional) - 2:43 
 "A Spring Wedding" - 3:07 
 "I'm Troubled in Mind" (Traditional) - 2:47 
 "On the Go" - 3:59 
 "Pax Vobiscum" - 4:12
Recorded at Ullern Church in Oslo, Norway in January 2006.

Personnel
John Surman – soprano saxophone, baritone saxophone, bass clarinet
 Howard Moody – church organ

References

ECM Records albums
John Surman albums
2008 albums
Albums produced by Manfred Eicher